Margaret McAllister Owen  (née Mackay; 27 November 1930 – 24 October 2014) was a British farmer, gardener and heritage activist.

Snowdrops 
She collected, grew, arranged and exhibited plants, especially snowdrops, holding an annual snowdrop party in her Shropshire garden, The Patch, each year in February.  A snowdrop, Galanthus elwesii Margaret Owen was named after her. She herself named a snowdrop after her husband, Galanthus elwesii Godfrey Owen.  This has two sets of six petals – inner and outer.  This has made it especially popular, and it has been propagated by twin-scaling to make it widely available.

National Collection 
She was the holder of four types of plant for the National Collection: Camassia, Dictamnus, Nerine and Veratrum. She bred new colour forms of camassias and pioneered nerines as a hardy plant in the UK. She was awarded the Veitch Memorial Medal in 2013.

Shrewsbury heritage 
Owen campaigned to save Rowley's House museum in Shrewsbury. She also founded The Corbet Bed Embroiders Trust to create period hangings for the sixteenth-century Corbet Bed. In 2010, she was awarded the honour of Most Excellent Order of the British Empire MBE, rewarding contributions to the arts and sciences.

References

External links 
 

1930 births
2014 deaths
English gardeners
People from Shropshire
Members of the Order of the British Empire
Veitch Memorial Medal recipients